The copper redhorse (Moxostoma hubbsi) is a North American species of freshwater fish in the family Catostomidae.
It is found only in Canada.

Its extremely small range, which is restricted to a few rivers in the lowlands of southwestern Quebec, has contracted significantly in the past few decades. Confirmed populations currently exist in the St. Lawrence and Richelieu rivers. Rivière des Mille Îles likely supports a remnant population. The copper redhorse is one of seven species of the genus Moxostoma (family Catostomidae) occurring in Canada. Its discovery has been attributed to Vianney Legendre in 1942, but it appears to have been first described by Pierre Fortin in 1866 as an already known species of the genus Moxostoma.

Habitat 

The copper redhorse occurs primarily in medium-sized rivers where water temperatures exceed 20 °C in summer. Spawning occurs in riffle areas where the current is moderate to slow and the depth ranges between 0.75 and 2 m, over fine to coarse gravel and cobble substrate. Like its congeners, young-of-the-year copper redhorse spend their first growing season in shallow shoreline areas no more than 1.5 m deep, characterized by gentle slopes, vegetation, a very slow current and fine substrate (mix of clay-silt and sand).

To date, there are only two known spawning grounds (Chambly archipelago and the channel downstream from the Saint-Ours dam) and a nursery area (Saint-Marc-sur-Richelieu) has been identified in the Richelieu River. Very recently, the presence of copper redhorse has again been reported in the Lavaltrie-Contrecoeur sector of the St. Lawrence River. The reasons for its presence in this stretch of the river in the spring and early summer (pre-spawning congregation, spawning or migration route) and fall (wintering grounds) could not be determined. High quality copper redhorse habitat is in decline. Its apparent extirpation from the Yamaska and Noire rivers is closely linked to environmental degradation.

Population sizes and trends
Archaeological excavations provide evidence that the species was more abundant at various times in the past. Since the mid-1980s, its abundance relative to the other species in the genus has declined significantly. The population is aging and recruitment is extremely low. Compared to its congeners, the relative abundance of young-of-the-year copper redhorse in the Richelieu River, the only river in which spawning is confirmed, is 0.35% or less. The upward shift in size distribution values in the past 30 to 40 years is significant. There have been virtually no catches of juveniles aged 2+ years in the last 30 years. The total number of mature individuals appears to be several thousand at the most.

Limiting factors and threats
A number of biological characteristics of the copper redhorse, such as its longevity, late age of sexual maturity, late spawning activities and specialized diet, make it unique among its congeners. However, they also contribute, in some respects, to making it more vulnerable. Since the waters inhabited by the copper redhorse are located in the most densely populated areas of Quebec, anthropogenic factors come into play. The nature of those factors cannot, however, be determined with certainty and act in combination. The degradation and fragmentation of its habitat and its low spawning success are believed to be key reasons for its decline. Contamination, siltation, eutrophication, introductions of non-native species, dam construction (which impedes the free passage of fish) and the disturbance of spawners on spawning sites all constitute possible factors in the species' decline.

Special significance of the species
The significance of the copper redhorse is not limited to scientific and ecological considerations. It extends to social values, sustainable development and biodiversity conservation. In some respects, the species is an indicator of the impact of human activity on the ecosystems of southern Quebec. Public interest in the species is not only strong but continues to grow.

References

Moxostoma
Taxonomy articles created by Polbot
Fish described in 1952
Endemic fauna of Quebec
Endemic fauna of Canada